

Łobez County is a unit of territorial administration and local government (powiat) in West Pomeranian Voivodeship, north-western Poland.

A Łobez County existed prior to the abolition of the powiats in 1975. When they were reintroduced in the Polish local government reforms of 1999, there was initially no Łobez County. The present-day county was created later, in 2002, out of parts of Gryfice County, Goleniów County and Stargard County (to which Łobez itself had belonged).

As of 2006 its total population is 38,232, out of which the population of Łobez is 10,617, that of Resko is 4,377, that of Węgorzyno is 3,011, that of Dobra is 2,028, and the rural population is 18,199.

Neighbouring counties
Łobez County is bordered by Gryfice County and Kołobrzeg County to the north, Świdwin County to the east, Drawsko County to the south-east, Stargard County to the south-west, and Goleniów County to the west.

Administrative division
The county is subdivided into five gminas (four urban-rural and one rural). These are listed in the following table, in descending order of population.

References
Polish official population figures 2006

Notes

 
Land counties of West Pomeranian Voivodeship